Clinidium baitense is a species of ground beetle in the subfamily Rhysodinae. It was described by R.T.Bell in 1970.

References

Clinidium
Beetles described in 1970